Robert Plot, the first man to illustrate a dinosaur fossil, is born.

References 

17th century in paleontology
Paleontology